Powwow Highway is a 1989 comedy-drama film from George Harrison’s  Handmade Films Company,  directed by Jonathan Wacks. Based on the novel Powwow Highway by David Seals, it features A Martinez, Gary Farmer, Joanelle Romero and Amanda Wyss. Wes Studi and Graham Greene, who were relatively unknown actors at the time, have small supporting roles.

Plot
Buddy Red Bow, a member of the Northern Cheyenne tribe of Lame Deer, Montana and a quick-tempered activist, is battling greedy developers. On the Northern Cheyenne Indian Reservation, he tries to persuade the council to vote against a strip-mining contract.

Philbert Bono is a hulk of a man guided by sacred visions. He wants to find his medicine, and gather tokens from the spirits.  During a night at the local bar, he gets inspired by watching a car commercial where a white salesman wearing a native headrest advertises to potential customers to find their own "pony". He takes this as a sign, and the next day he visits a junkyard and trades some marijuana to an indifferent proprietor to find his "war pony". As he looks outside the window of the junkyard office, he has a vision of several horses running in his direction, one of them more distinct than the other.  He eventually settles on a beat up and paint-worn 1964 Buick Wildcat sitting in the middle of the yard of other cars, which he names "Protector" as the proprietor tosses him the keys. After a couple of unsuccessful starts, Protector eventually springs to life and he drives off. Throughout his journey, various parts of the car fall off.

Elsewhere, Buddy's estranged sister, Bonnie, is arrested in Santa Fe, New Mexico because of drugs planted in the trunk of her car. Buddy is later contacted, and is the only family member who can help Bonnie and her children, Jane and Sky Red Bow. This is eventually revealed as a ploy by the greedy developers trying to pass the strip-mining contract. Without Buddy's presence to vote, they'll have a better chance at succeeding.

Buddy does not own a car, but needs to get to his sister. He convinces his childhood acquaintance Philbert to take him to his sister, as Philbert happily obliges telling Buddy that they are "Cheyenne". In their childhood, Buddy found Philbert awkward and embarrassing, and Philbert was bullied for being fat. Buddy's attitude towards Philbert has not changed very much, but wonders if Philbert remembers how mean he had been to him.  Buddy's absence attracts concern that he won't arrive in time, but the tribal chief insists that he will always find a way and that he has done more for the community than anyone else has.

They set out on their road trip, and Philbert's easygoing ways contrast with Buddy's more reactive personality. Philbert's frequent stops to pray and eat prove irritating to Buddy, as rather than going directly to Santa Fe, Philbert is motivated by his own journey to gather "good medicine" to help them get Bonnie out of prison, even going so far as to take a detour. Along the way they meet with friends in other communities, attend a Pow Wow at Pine Ridge Indian Reservation where Buddy dances with other veterans, and visit the sacred Black Hills in South Dakota where Philbert reverently leaves a giant Hershey's chocolate bar as an offering to his ancestors. Eventually Buddy joins Philbert in praying and singing to the ancestors in a river. Gradually, the men grow to appreciate and respect one another. Meanwhile, Bonnie has her children contact her best friend, Rabbit, to help pay for the $2000 bail. Unfortunately, it cannot be processed until after the holidays.

When they finally reach Santa Fe, they meet up with Bonnie's friend Rabbit and cause a scene at the precinct. As Rabbit and Buddy interact with the cops, Philbert manages to take $4000 in cash from one of the open rooms. The three eventually regroup at a local area to drink, where Rabbit and Buddy form a minor attraction towards one another. Philbert agrees to fetch Bonnie's kids, who were staying at a nearby hotel and takes them without officially checking out.  They head directly to the precinct where Bonnie is being held without telling Buddy and Rabbit, who also try to get there.

The tribal chief has also arrived to talk to Bonnie. Philbert received inspiration from a scene out of an old western during one of their stops, and puts it to use by breaking Bonnie out of jail by using Protector and a rope to yank the jail bars off the building.  As the tribal chief was waiting, he notices through the window what Philbert had been doing and quietly leaves the precinct in his truck without telling anyone else. A police chase ensues and Buddy temporarily stays behind to slow down their pursuit by throwing the loose window of Philbert's car at one of the cop cars, causing it to crash. He is soon picked up by Philbert as they continue their escape outside the city. However, Protector loses its brakes on a downhill road, forcing everyone to jump from the car except Philbert who seemingly perishes in the wreck. Seeing the car in flames, the police decide to call off the chase, and backup and leave the scene. After mourning Philbert's death, Buddy, Rabbit, Bonnie and her kids discover that Philbert actually survived the crash and they embrace him.  Philbert returns Buddy's necklace, and the two join the others as they walk down the highway.  Fortunately, the chief of their tribe had been following them after the jailbreak and pulls up with his truck to give them a ride home, presumably to get home in time to vote against the strip-mining contract.

Cast

Production 
Filming was done on location on Native American reservations in Wyoming, Montana, South Dakota, and Santa Fe, New Mexico.

Music
Several songs by Robbie Robertson, from his 1987 solo album, accompany scenes in the film.

Reception

Box office 
Powwow Highway was screened in 14 theaters and grossed $283,747 at the North American box office.

Critical response 
The character of Philbert Bono was described as a scene-stealer by The New York Times' Janet Maslin, who wrote Philbert is "notable for his tremendous appetite, his unflappably even keel, and his determination to find some kind of spiritual core in contemporary American Indian life." The chemistry between the two leads was also praised. In a three-star review, Roger Ebert called Gary Farmer's performance "...one of the most wholly convincing I’ve seen", and added "What Powwow Highway does best is to create two unforgettable characters and give them some time together."

Awards
Won
 Sundance Film Festival – Filmmakers Trophy – Dramatic (Jonathan Wacks)
 Native American Film Festival – Best Picture (Jan Wieringa, George Harrison & Denis O'Brien)
 Native American Film Festival – Best Director (Jonathan Wacks)
 Native American Film Festival – Best Actor (A Martinez)
Nominated
 Sundance Film Festival – Grand Jury Prize (Jonathan Wacks)
 Independent Spirit Awards – Best First Feature (Jan Wieringa, Jonathan Wacks, George Harrison & Denis O'Brien)
 Independent Spirit Awards – Best Supporting Male (Gary Farmer)
 Independent Spirit Awards – Best Cinematography (Toyomichi Kurita)

References

External links
 
 
 
 

1989 films
1989 independent films
1980s road comedy-drama films
American road comedy-drama films
American buddy comedy-drama films
1980s buddy comedy-drama films
Films about Native Americans
Films shot in New Mexico
Films set in New Mexico
Films set in Montana
Films based on American novels
1989 comedy films
1989 drama films
1989 directorial debut films
Films scored by Barry Goldberg
Sundance Film Festival award winners
1980s English-language films
1980s American films